The 2021–22 Stony Brook Seawolves women's basketball team represents Stony Brook University in the 2021–22 NCAA Division I women's basketball season. They play their home games at the Island Federal Credit Union Arena in Stony Brook, New York and are led by first-year head coach Ashley Langford, who took over the position after Caroline McCombs left to become the head coach for George Washington. They are members of the America East Conference.

The 2021–22 season will be the program's last season as an America East member. Stony Brook will join the Colonial Athletic Association on July 1, 2022. In response, America East presidents voted to ban Stony Brook from conference tournament play on February 2, 2022, according to America East by-laws.

Previous season
Stony Brook made the NCAA Tournament for the first time in 2021, defeating Maine 64–60 in the America East championship game. Stony Brook entered the conference tournament as the two seed, upsetting Maine who was the one seed. The two teams were supposed to meet in the 2020 America East championship game, with Stony Brook as the one seed and Maine as the two seed, but the game was cancelled due to the COVID-19 pandemic. Stony Brook was 28–3 that season and was named America East champions as the highest seed remaining in the tournament.

In the 2021 NCAA Division I women's basketball tournament, Stony Brook was a 14 seed and faced 3-seed Arizona in the first round. Stony Brook lost 79–44. Head coach Caroline McCombs left to become the head coach of George Washington after the season ended.

Roster

Schedule and results

|-
!colspan=12 style=| Exhibition

|-
!colspan=12 style=| Non-conference regular season

|-
!colspan=12 style=| America East regular season

|-
!colspan=12 style=| WNIT

Source

See also 
 2021–22 Stony Brook Seawolves men's basketball team

References 

Stony Brook Seawolves women's basketball seasons
Stony Brook Seawolves
Stony Brook Seawolves women's basketball
Stony Brook Seawolves women's basketball
Stony Brook